Liana Gyurjyan (born 13 June 2002) is an Armenian weightlifter. She is a two-time bronze medalist at the European Weightlifting Championships. She also won the gold medal in the women's 81 kg event at the 2021 Junior World Weightlifting Championships held in Tashkent, Uzbekistan.

Career 

She won the gold medal in the under-15 girls 69 kg event at the 2017 European Youth Weightlifting Championships held in Pristina, Kosovo. She also won the gold medal in the under-17 girls 69 kg event at the 2018 European Youth Weightlifting Championships held in San Donato Milanese, Italy. She competed in the girls' +63kg event at the 2018 Summer Youth Olympics held in Buenos Aires, Argentina. In that same year, she competed in the women's 71 kg event at the World Weightlifting Championships held in Ashgabat, Turkmenistan.

At the 2019 European Weightlifting Championships held in Batumi, Georgia, she finished in 4th place in the women's 81kg event but this became the bronze medal after disqualification of the original gold medalist Eleni Konstantinidi of Greece. In that same year, she won the gold medal in the junior women's 81kg event at the 2019 European Junior & U23 Weightlifting Championships in Bucharest, Romania.

In 2021, she won the bronze medal in the women's 81kg event at the European Weightlifting Championships held in Moscow, Russia. At the 2021 European Junior & U23 Weightlifting Championships in Rovaniemi, Finland, she won the gold medal in her event.

She won the gold medal in her event at the 2022 European Junior & U23 Weightlifting Championships held in Durrës, Albania.

Major results

References

External links 
 

Living people
2002 births
Place of birth missing (living people)
Armenian female weightlifters
Weightlifters at the 2018 Summer Youth Olympics
European Weightlifting Championships medalists
21st-century Armenian women